The Société Française de Physique (SFP), or the French Physical Society,  is the main professional society of French physicists. It was founded in 1873 by Charles Joseph d'Almeida.

History
The French Physical Society is a state-approved non-profit scientific society aiming to promote the knowledge of physics. Its member include physicists living in France, regardless of background. 

As well as promoting physics, the SFP also acts as a lobbying organization with French policymakers alongside other scientific societies, the like the French Academy of Sciences, French Society of Mathematicians, and Union of Physicists.

The SFP organizes a large number of events (conferences, workshops, exhibitions, etc.) for academic and general audiences. The SFP edits the Bulletin Newsletters and the review Reflets de la Physique. Each year, the SFP awards several prizes to physicists in honor of specific works or actions towards the promotion of physics outside the community.

The SFP is a member of the European Physical Society (EPS) and of the International Union of Pure and Applied Physics (IUPAP).

Emergent Scientist

Emergent Scientist is a scientific and educational open access academic journal, which positions itself as a journal that helps students get their first publication experience. It was established in 2016 on the initiative of the Société.

The main authors are the participants of the International Physicists' Tournament, who are given the opportunity to publish their articles with the solutions of the tournament problems in the journal free of charge (financed by the organizing committee of the tournament). Other articles on physics and mathematics can also be published in the journal, but at the charge of the authors. It is not necessary that  articles are innovative, they can even focus on well-known phenomena, but they must study the problems from a scientific and didactic point of view. On the other hand, the journal places high emphasis on the quality of presentation of the results and their scientific substantiation. In a special section of the journal entitled Dead Ends, authors are invited to discuss theoretical approaches and experimental research that failed for one reason or another.

See also
 European Physical Society

Further reading

External links

 Emergent Scientist
 
 

Physics societies
Scientific organizations established in 1873
1873 establishments in France
Scientific organizations based in France